Tripylella quitoensis is a species of nematodes, first found in Fátima, Portugal. It can be differentiated by its rather short body length (averaging ); possessing short outer labial setae; its short pharynx; carrying anterior subventral teeth and a posterior dorsal tooth in the same stomal chamber; having a short tail; exhibiting body pores and somatic setae, as well as a striated cuticle and non-protruding vulval lips, among other characteristics.

References 

Enoplia